The 7 October Movement is a South Sudanese opposition group founded by Kerbino Wol Agok. Wol, a businessman and philanthropist, was detained by the National Security Service without a charge in April 2018. He started a riot in the National Security Headquarters, or Blue House, on October 7, 2018, from which the group gets its name, and was sentenced to 10 years in prison. However, he was pardoned by president Salva Kiir in January 2020. Wol announced that he had founded the movement on June 5, 2020, and at that time claimed to have 1,000 men in the rural areas of South Sudan. Wol claimed that many members of the movement fought under John Garang in the Second Sudanese Civil War, and also that many of them had been prisoners in the Blue House. The group is opposed to the current leadership, which the 7 October Movement believes have kept South Sudan in poverty, as well as the National Security Service and the current prison system, which the group believes is unjust.

Less than two weeks after the movement was announced, on June 14, 2020, Kerbino Wol Agok was killed, leaving the future of the group uncertain. According to the South Sudan People's Defense Forces, Wol was killed in a clash at Ayen Mayar village in Rumbek East County in Lakes State along with three other 7 October Movement fighters. One civilian was also killed and two others were wounded in the clash.

Notes 

 a. Also called the Seventh of October Movement, October 7th Movement, or the 7th October Movement

References

Factions of the South Sudanese Civil War
Political parties established in 2020
Rebel groups in South Sudan